Nurlan Novruzov (born 3 March 1993) is an Azerbaijani professional footballer who plays as forward for Martyr's Memorial A-Division League club Machhindra.

Career

Club
On 25 July 2019, Novruzov signed contract with Moldovan National Division side FC Dinamo-Auto Tiraspol.

On 21 February 2020, Novruzov signed for Meistriliiga club JK Narva Trans after impressing on trial.

On 16 April 2021, Novruzov signed a contract with Nepal Super League franchise team Lalitpur City Football Club.

On 27 October 2021, Novruzov signed a season deal contract with Martyr's Memorial A-Division League club Machhindra F.C.

Honours

Club
FC Baku
 Azerbaijan Cup: 2011–12

Individual
Azerbaijan Premier League Top Scorer: 2014–15

References

External links
 

1993 births
Living people
Azerbaijani footballers
Azerbaijan under-21 international footballers
Azerbaijan youth international footballers
Azerbaijani expatriate footballers
Expatriate footballers in Turkey
Azerbaijani expatriate sportspeople in Turkey
Expatriate footballers in Moldova
Azerbaijan Premier League players
Moldovan Super Liga players
FC Baku players
Sumgayit FK players
Sabail FK players
FC Dinamo-Auto Tiraspol players
Association football forwards
Expatriate footballers in Nepal
Lalitpur City FC players
Azerbaijani expatriate sportspeople in Nepal
Nepal Super League players